John Halle (died c. 1409), of Dover, Kent, was an English politician.

Family
Halle was the son of Nicholas atte Halle, an innkeeper who also became an MP and mayor. John married a woman named Isabel and they had one son and two daughters.

Career
He was a Member (MP) of the Parliament of England for Dover in 1371,
1372, 1373, 1376, 1378, 1381, May 1382, October 1382, February 1383, November 1384, 1386 and February 1388. He was Mayor of Dover in the periods September 1371 – 1372, 1373–4, 1380–1, 1388–9, 1391–2 and 1393–4.

References

14th-century births
1409 deaths
English MPs 1371
15th-century English people
English MPs 1372
Mayors of Dover
English MPs 1373
English MPs 1376
English MPs 1378
English MPs 1381
English MPs May 1382
English MPs October 1382
English MPs February 1383
English MPs November 1384
English MPs 1386
English MPs February 1388
Members of the Parliament of England for Dover